Viive Aamisepp (since 1969 Viive Käro; born 21 April 1936) is an Estonian actress.
She was born in Haapsalu. From 1958 to 1961 she studied the English language at the University of Tartu.

From 1961 to 2009 she worked at Rakvere Theatre. Besides theatre roles she also played in radio dramas.

She is married to actor Volli Käro.

Roles

 1961
 "Romeo, Julia ja pimedus" – Ester
 "Kõik jääb inimestele" – Ziina
 "Politseitund" – Mitzi

References

Living people
1936 births
Estonian stage actresses
Estonian radio actresses
University of Tartu alumni
People from Haapsalu